Amarajeevi (Kannada: ಅಮರಜೀವಿ) is a 1965 Indian Kannada film, directed by G. Krishna Murthy and produced by D. Narayanappa. The film stars Raja Shankar, Harini, T. N. Balakrishna and Narasimharaju in the lead roles. The film has musical score by Vijaya Bhaskar.

Cast
Raja Shankar
Harini
T. N. Balakrishna
Narasimharaju
B. Ramadevi

Soundtrack
The music was composed by Vijaya Bhaskar.

References

Films scored by Vijaya Bhaskar
1960s Kannada-language films